Beatrice of Navarre (1392-1412/1415) was a daughter of Charles III of Navarre and his wife, Eleanor of Castile.

Biography 

She was a member of the House of Évreux. Her surviving siblings were Blanche I of Navarre, wife of John II of Aragon, and Isabella of Navarre, wife of John IV of Armagnac.

In 1406 in Pamplona, Beatrice married James II, Count of La Marche, son of John I, Count of La Marche, and Catherine of Vendôme. The couple had three children:
 Isabelle (1408 – aft. 1445), a nun at Besançon
 Marie (1410 – aft. 1445), a nun at Amiens
 Eleanor of Bourbon-La Marche (1412 – aft. 21 August 1464), married Bernard d'Armagnac, Count of Pardiac (d. 1462)

It is not certain when Beatrice died. She died between 1412 and 1415, possibly while giving birth to her daughter Eleanor in 1412.

Ancestry

1392 births
Navarrese infantas
House of Évreux
1410s deaths
14th-century nobility from the Kingdom of Navarre
15th-century nobility from the Kingdom of Navarre
Deaths in childbirth
Daughters of kings